The Power is an upcoming British science fiction drama television series developed by Raelle Tucker, Naomi Alderman, and Sarah Quintrell for Amazon Prime Video, based on Alderman's 2016 novel of the same name. The first season is expected to consist of nine episodes, and is scheduled to premiere on March 31, 2023.

Premise 
The world of The Power is our world, but for one twist of nature. Suddenly, and without warning, all teenage girls in the world develop the power to electrocute people at will. It's hereditary, it's inbuilt, and it can't be taken away from them. Coming alive to the thrill of pure power: the ability to hurt or even kill by releasing electrical jolts from their fingertips, they rapidly learn they can awaken the Power in older women. Soon enough nearly every woman in the world can do it. And then everything is different.

Cast and characters

Main 
 Toni Collette as Margot Cleary-Lopez: The mayor of Seattle and a mother of three kids.
 Auliʻi Cravalho as Jos Cleary-Lopez: Margot's daughter.
 John Leguizamo as Rob: Margot's husband.
 Toheeb Jimoh as Tunde: An aspiring video journalist with big dreams.
 Ria Zmitrowicz as Roxy Monke: The illegitimate daughter of Bernie Monke.
 Halle Bush as Allie
 Nico Hiraga as Ryan
 Heather Agyepong as Ndudi: Tunde's close friend.
 Daniela Vega as Sister Maria
 Eddie Marsan as Bernie Monke: A feared London crime boss.
 Archie Rush as Darrell Monke
 Gerrison Machado as Matt Cleary-Lopez
 Pietra Castro as Izzy Cleary-Lopez
 Zrinka Cvitešić as Tatiana Moskalev: The wife of the Moldovan President Viktor Moskalev.

Recurring 
 Josh Charles as Daniel Dandon: The Governor of Washington State and a "constant thorn" in the side of Margot Cleary-Lopez.
 Rob Delaney as Tom
 Alice Eve as Kristen
 Edwina Findley as Helen: Margot Cleary-Lopez's highly competent and trusted advisor.
 Jacob Fortune-Lloyd as Ricky Monke
 Avital Lvova as Liat Monke
 Sam Buchanan as Terry Monke
 Juliet Cowan as Barbara Monke
 Simbi Ajikawo as Adunola
 Ana Ularu as Zoia: Tatiana's sister.

Episodes 

Ugla Hauksdóttir, Lisa Gunning, Neasa Hardiman, Logan Kibens, and Shannon Murphy will direct episodes. The third episode is written by Raelle Tucker & Sue Chung, and the sixth is written by Stacy Osei-Kuffour and Raelle Tucker & Brennan Peters.

Production

Development 
In February 2019, it was announced that Jane Featherstone and Reed Morano would adapt The Power for Amazon. The production company Sister Pictures had previously optioned the book in 2016. The Power was created by Naomi Alderman, who wrote the novel on which the series is based. The series is executive produced by Featherstone, Naomi de Pear, Alderman, Claire Wilson, and Raelle Tucker and produced by Tim Bricknell. In March 2023, Morano exited the series, opting not to be credited as director and executive producer.

Writing 
The series has an all-female writers room, which includes Claire Wilson, Sarah Quintrell, Whit Anderson, Stacy Osei-Kuffour, Rebecca Levene, Raelle Tucker, Sue Chung, and Brennan Peters. Quintrell also serves as co-executive producer and story consultant.

Casting 
In late October 2019, Leslie Mann was cast as Margot Cleary-Lopez. Auliʻi Cravalho was cast the next month as Jos Cleary-Lopez. In January 2020, John Leguizamo, Toheeb Jimoh, Ria Zmitrowicz, Halle Bush, Heather Agyepong, Nico Hiraga and Daniela Vega were cast. Later that month, Eddie Marsan was cast as Bernie Monke. In February, Rainn Wilson was cast as Daniel Dandon, but was replaced by Tim Robbins in January 2021 due to scheduling conflicts caused by the COVID-19 pandemic. The next month, Rob Delaney, Alice Eve, Edwina Findley, Jacob Fortune-Lloyd, Sam Buchanan, Juliet Cowan, and Simbi Ajikawo were cast in recurring roles. Archie Rush, Gerrison Machado, Pietra Castro and Zrinka Cvitešić were cast as series regulars. In April, Ana Ularu was cast as Zoia. In May 2022, it was reported that Mann and Robbins had dropped out of the series. In August, it was announced that their roles would be assumed by Toni Collette and Josh Charles, respectively.

Filming 
The series was set to start production in late 2019 in Georgia, but withdrew due to a newly-signed abortion law. Filming began in early February 2020 but was paused in March due to the COVID-19 pandemic. Filming occurred in Fairford and Lechlade. Other shooting locations included the Crystal Palace National Sports Centre and Bawdsey, which was chosen to take the place of Toronto, where filming was supposed to occur before the pandemic. In late October 2021, the series filmed near Walvis Bay in Namibia.

Collette filmed her scenes for the series over a period of five weeks.

Release
The first three episodes are set to premiere on Prime Video on March 31, 2023, with one new episode released each Friday until the finale on May 12, 2023.

References

External links 
 

Upcoming drama television series
Amazon Prime Video original programming
2023 British television series debuts
2020s British drama television series
British thriller television series
Television series by Amazon Studios
Television shows based on British novels
Television shows filmed in the United Kingdom
Television shows filmed in England
Television shows filmed in Namibia
Television productions postponed due to the COVID-19 pandemic
English-language television shows